The Pixar Photoscience Division, a division of Pixar Animation Studios, was founded in 1979 at Lucasfilm for the express purpose of designing and building a laser recorder/scanner system to input and output film to a computer for compositing and color correction of special effects. In the early years of Pixar's history, the team was responsible for the design of color monitoring instrumentation to control the color gamut and gamma of the digital images onto 35mm film using a more advance laser recorder system called PixarVision. In later years at Pixar, the team was responsible for transforming the artists computer animated images onto film master negatives. Today the team manages all digital content to a variety of delivery media, film, DVD, and digital cinema projection. The team has won Engineering and Technical Academy Awards and patents for their work in Motion Picture Sciences.

Key People

 David DiFrancesco  Director of Photosciences
 Beth Sullivan  Administration Manager
 Matt Martin  Hardware/Software Engineer
 Tom Noggle  Hardware/Software Engineer
 James Burgess  Software Engineer
 Don Conway  Technician
 Babak Sanii Software Instrumentation Engineer
 John Shlens Software Instrumentation Engineer

Consultants

 Gary Starkweather
 Bala S. Manian
 Peter Flowers

Awards

 Academy of Motion Pictures Arts and Sciences Scientific and Technical Achievement Award, 1998
 Academy of Motion Pictures Arts and Sciences Scientific and Technical Achievement Award, 1994
 Royal Photographic Society ARPS, 1985
 National Endowment for the Arts Fellowship, 1979
 National Endowment for the Arts Fellowship, 1977
 National Endowment for the Arts Fellowship, 1975
 National Endowment for the Arts Fellowship, 1974

Patents

 5,194,969 Method for Borderless Mapping of Texture Images
 5,771,109 Method and Apparatus for Digitizing Film Using a Stroboscopic Scanning System
 5,815,202 Method and Apparatus for Scanning an Image with a Moving Lens System
 5,831,757 Multiple Cylinder Deflection System
 6,172,705 Method and Apparatus for Film Scanner Interface
 6,628,442 Method and Apparatus for Beam Deflection Using Multiple Beam Scanning Galvanometers
 7,336,349 Two-Dimensional Array Spectroscopy
 7,463,821 Flat Panel Image to Film Transfer Method and Apparatus
 7,576,830 Configurable Flat Panel Image to Film Transfer Method and Apparatus
 7,787,010 Video to Film Flat Panel Digital Recorder and Method
 8,233,693 Automatic Print and Negative Verification Method and Apparatus
 8,368,700 Animatronics Animation Method and Apparatus
 8,502,909 Super Light-Field Lens

References

 Raymond Fielding, "The Technique of Special Effects Cinematography" (4th edition 1985)  page 405
 Michael Hiltzik, "Dealers of Lightning Xerox Parc and the Dawn of the Computer Age" (1999)  page 240
 John Markoff, "What the Dormouse Said, How the 60's Counterculture Shaped the Personal Computer Industry" (2005) , Xerox Parc, pages 241-42, 248, 251-53
 David Price, "The Pixar Touch" (2008)  pages 22,24, 36, 34, 38, 54, 68, 75,104,137
 Michael Rubin, "droidMaker: George Lucas and the Digital Revolution" (2005)  pages 119-120, 141, 152-153, 200-201, 225-226, 253, 264, 370, 371, 502

External links
 The Pixar Story: Dick Shoup, Alex Schure, George Lucas, Steve Jobs, and Disney
 Pixar History
 Pixar Story
 Alvy Ray Smith Interview

Pixar